Irvingbaileya is a monotypic genus of flowering plants belonging to the family Stemonuraceae. It is a dioecious tree.

There is only one species, Irvingbaileya australis, endemic to Queensland, Australia.

The genus name of Irvingbaileya is in honour of Irving Widmer Bailey (1884–1967), an American botanist known for his work in plant anatomy, and the Latin specific epithet of australis means coming from the Australia.

The genus was first described and published in Brittonia Vol.5 on page 50 in 1943.
Also the species was first described and published by Cyril Tenison White in Lloydia Vol.6 on page 143 in 1943.

References

Stemonuraceae
Monotypic asterid genera
Dioecious plants
Plants described in 1943
Flora of Queensland